KDPI (88.5 FM) is a radio station licensed to serve the community of Ketchum, Idaho, broadcasting to the Wood River Valley. The station is owned by KDPI Drop-In Radio, Inc. It airs a variety radio format.

The station was assigned the KDPI call letters by the Federal Communications Commission on May 10, 2011.

References

External links
 Official Website
 

DPI (FM)
Radio stations established in 2013
2013 establishments in the United States
Variety radio stations in the United States
Blaine County, Idaho